The Ovation, more commonly known as Ovation, was a Thai music band from 1982 to 1992. From 1982 to 1988, the band was in  record label, and from 1989 to 1992 was in Pro Media Mart record label. The band consists of seven members.

History
The band releases an album once a year. The lead female singer was changed three times, first time in 1987 to Pornpimon Tummasarn.

After Pornpimon left the band in 1989, the band has ended contract with Nititad Promotion, forcing it to be moved to Pro Media Mart, a smaller record label. The band was then go into the decline. The last album Ovation 212, released in 1992, has had less sales than ever.

Band members
 Charin Suwannarak (born September 19, 1958) pianist and lead male singer
 Wisut Yaemoepsin (born July 16, 1956) guitarist
 Wisut Limpinan (born July 10, 1957) guitarist
 Prasert Chimthuam (born August 19, 1960) saxophone, flutist, keyboard
 Anan Aksonpinit (born July 20, 1958) bass
 Sumet Phikunyaem (born July 21, 1958) drummer (until 1986)
 Waiyawut Sakunsapphaisan keyboard and lead male singer (since 1985)
 Uaichai Prakhongsin drummer (since 1987)
  (August 3, 1964 - October 10, 2012) lead female singer (1982 to 1987)
 Pornpimon Tummasarn (born April 11, 1968) lead female singer (1987 to 1989)
 Phanitda Nilrat Na Ayudhya lead female singer (1989)
 Nongnuch Chuenkrachang lead female singer (1991 to 1992)

References 

Thai pop music groups
1982 establishments in Thailand